Jiří Krejza is a former Czechoslovak-born Swiss slalom canoeist who competed from the early 1970s to the early 1980s. He won four medals at the ICF Canoe Slalom World Championships with a gold (C-2: 1973 for Czechoslovakia), two silvers (C-2 team: 1973 for Czechoslovakia, 1977 for Switzerland) and a bronze (Mixed C-2: 1971 for Czechoslovakia).

References

Czechoslovak male canoeists
Swiss male canoeists
Living people
Year of birth missing (living people)
Medalists at the ICF Canoe Slalom World Championships